Ivan Miluška (born 23 March 1946) is a Czech rower. He competed in the men's coxed pair event at the 1968 Summer Olympics.

References

1946 births
Living people
Czech male rowers
Olympic rowers of Czechoslovakia
Rowers at the 1968 Summer Olympics
Sportspeople from Brno